The 2013 Speedy Services UK Open was a darts tournament staged by the Professional Darts Corporation. It was the eleventh year of the UK Open tournament where, following numerous regional qualifying heats throughout Britain, players competed in a single elimination tournament to be crowned champion. The tournament was held at the Reebok Stadium in Bolton, England, between 6–9 June 2013, and has the nickname, "the FA Cup of darts" as a random draw is staged after each round until the final.

Phil Taylor won the title, defeating Andy Hamilton 11–4 in the final to claim his fifth and final UK Open title.

The 2013 UK Open was the last UK Open to be held at the Reebok Stadium in Bolton, and was the last UK Open to be broadcast on Sky Sports in June. Starting in 2014, the UK Open moved to the Butlins Resort in Minehead, and has been broadcast on ITV4 in March.

Format and qualifiers

2013 UK Open qualifiers
There were eight qualifying events staged across England between February and April 2013 to determine the UK Open Order of Merit Table. The tournament winners were:

The tournament features 146 players. The results of the eight qualifiers shown above were collated into the UK Open Order Of Merit. The top 32 players in the Order of Merit, who played a minimum of two events, received a place at the final tournament. In addition, the next 82 players in the Order of Merit list qualified for the tournament, but needed to start in the earlier rounds played on the Thursday. A further 32 players qualified via regional qualifying tournaments.

Top 32 in Order of Merit (receiving byes into third round)

Number 33-64 of the Order of Merit (receiving byes into second round)

Remaining Order of Merit qualifiers (starting in first and preliminary round)

Speedy qualifiers
32 players qualified from Speedy qualifiers held at four venues across Britain in April.

Hampden Park, Glasgow
  Gus Santana
  Andy Murray
  Gary Stone
  Jamie Hagen
  Tam Dymond
  Scott Robertson
  Andrew McNicol
  Andy Boulton

Old Trafford, Manchester
  Stephen Bunting
  Michael Bushby
  Mark McGeeney
  Darren Twist
  Stuart Lowe
  Nigel Daniels
  Tony Martin
  Paul Whitworth

Civic Hall, Wolverhampton
  Darrell Thorpe
  Matt Gallett
  Gavin Baker
  Michael Musto
  Robbie Singleton
  Robbie Green
  Jake Pennington
  Dean Stewart

Alexandra Palace, London
  Conan Whitehead
  Darrell Townsend
  Terry Dunford
  John Mortimer
  Maik Langendorf
  Scott Marsh
  Steven Mead
  Michael Burgoine

Prize money
For the fifth consecutive UK Open, the prize fund will be £200,000.

Draw

Thursday 6 June; Best of nine legs

Preliminary round

First round

Second round

Friday 7 June; Best of seventeen legs

Third round

Saturday 8 June; Best of seventeen legs

Fourth round

† Newton hit a nine-dart finish, having thrown 180, 180, and 141 to finish the leg.

Fifth round

Sunday 9 June

Quarter-finals; Best of nineteen legs

Semi-finals and Final

See also
2013 PDC Pro Tour includes extended results of Pro Tour events

References

External links
The official PDC page for the UK Open

UK Open
UK Open Darts
UK Open (darts)
Sport in the Metropolitan Borough of Bolton
UK Open